Scott Falls is a waterfall located along highway M-28 in Alger County, Michigan near the town of Au Train. The falls can be seen from the highway; they are across the road from the H.J. Rathfoot State Roadside Park.

References
Michigan Interactive
Great Lakes Waterfalls

Waterfalls of Michigan
Landforms of Alger County, Michigan
Tourist attractions in Alger County, Michigan
Articles containing video clips